The 10th Saturn Awards, honoring the best in science fiction, fantasy and horror film in 1982, were held on July 30, 1983.

Winners and nominees 
Below is a complete list of nominees and winners. Winners are highlighted in bold.

Film awards

Special awards

Posthumous Award
 Buster Crabbe

Life Career Award
 Martin B. Cohen

References

External links
 Official Website 

Saturn Awards ceremonies
Saturn
Saturn